The 2018–19 Saskatchewan Junior Hockey League was the league's 50th Season.

Final standings 
 x = Clinched playoff position
 y = Clinched division
 e = Eliminated from playoffs

Playoffs

ANAVET Cup

References 

Saskatchewan Junior Hockey League